Athletics competitions at the 2015 Southeast Asian Games were held at the National Stadium, East Coast Park and Kallang Practice Track in Singapore from 6 to 12 June. A total of 46 athletics events are featured at the 28th SEA Games, divided evenly between the sexes. The marathon started and finished in the stadium and had a route in the surrounding area including the East Coast Park, Marina Bay and the Gardens by the Bay.

A total of eleven games records were broken at the competition. Further to this, 42 national record marks were equalled or bettered and three regional bests for Southeast Asia were set. The regional records included 5.30 m in the men's pole vault by Porranot Purahong and 16.76 m in the men's triple jump by Muhammad Hakimi Ismail.

Thailand maintained its long streak at the top of the athletics medal table, winning seventeen events and ending the competition with 39 medals. Vietnam was the runner-up with eleven gold medals among its haul of 34 medals. (Thailand was most successful in the field events, while Vietnam won most of its medals on the track.) Indonesia won the next highest number of gold medals at seven, while the Philippines had the third highest medal total with 21. The host nation Singapore won three gold medals. Seven of the eleven participating nations reached the medal table.

Two Filipino Americans—Eric Cray and Kayla Richardson—won the men's and women's 100 metres and a third, Caleb Stuart, won the men's hammer throw. Cray completed a double, defending his 400 m hurdles title as well and being one of seven athletes to win two individual gold medals at the games. Two Indonesian women had doubles: Maria Natalia Londa won both the women's long jump and triple jump titles, while reigning 10,000 m champion Triyaningsih won over that distance and also the 5000 m (the fourth time in her career she had won that double). The remaining three doubles were achieved by Vietnamese athletes: Nguyễn Thị Huyền won the 400 m flat and hurdles, while Dương Văn Thái and Đỗ Thị Thảo won all the men's and women's middle-distance titles between them.

A total of seventeen athletes defended their titles from the 2013 Southeast Asian Games, with both Đỗ Thị Thảo and Maria Natalia Londa completing the same doubles they had previously. Zhang Guirong had her sixth straight win in the women's shot put, while Triyaningsih extended her unbeaten run in the 10,000 m to five. Jamras Rittidet took his fourth consecutive SEA Games gold medal in the men's 110 m hurdles. Three women had their third straight SEA Games wins: Rini Budiarti (steeplechase), Nguyễn Thị Thanh Phúc (20 km walk) and Subenrat Insaeng (discus).

Competition schedule
The following was the competition schedule for the athletics competitions:

Records
A total of eleven games records were improved at the competition.

Men

Women

Medalists

Men's events

Women's events

Medal table
Thailand topped the medal table with seventeen gold medals and a total of 39 medals.

See also
 Athletics at the 2015 ASEAN Para Games

Participating nations
A total of 346 athletes (195 men, 151 women) from 11 nations competed in athletics at the 2015 Southeast Asian Games:

References

External links
 
Full results

 
Kallang